Cather House may refer to:

Cather Farm, Beloit, Kansas, listed on the National Register of Historic Places (NRHP) in Kansas
George Cather Farmstead, Bladen, Nebraska, listed on the NRHP in Nebraska
Willa Cather House, Red Cloud, Nebraska, listed on the NRHP
William Cather Homestead Site, Red Cloud, Nebraska, listed on the NRHP in Nebraska
Willa Cather Birthplace, Gore, Virginia, listed on the NRHP